.22 BB Cap (Bulleted Breech Cap) also known as the 6mm Flobert, is a variety of .22 caliber rimfire ammunition. Invented by Louis-Nicolas Flobert in 1845, it was the first rimfire metallic cartridge. The .22 BB Cap and .22 CB Cap are interchangeable and are relatively quiet low velocity cartridges, designed for indoor target shooting.

History
Frenchman Louis-Nicolas Flobert invented the first rimfire metallic cartridge in 1845. His cartridge consisted of a percussion cap with a bullet attached to the top. Flobert then made what he called "parlor guns" for this cartridge, as these rifles and pistols were designed to be shot in indoor shooting parlors in large homes. Usually derived in the 6 mm and 9 mm calibres, it is since then called the Flobert cartridge, but it does not contain any powder; the only propellant substance contained in the cartridge is within the percussion cap. In Europe, the .22 BB Cap and .22 CB Cap are both called 6mm Flobert and are considered the same cartridge.

Description
These rimfires closely resemble a .22 caliber air rifle in power and are often used for indoor shooting and close range pest control. Developed for indoor shooting galleries with special "gallery guns", the .22 BB Cap was the first rimfire cartridge, dating back to 1845. It has no separate propellant charge, relying on the impulse created by the primer alone to fire a round lead ball. This results in a low muzzle velocity of around 700 ft/s (210 m/s) or less.  More common is the .22 CB cap, which fires a slightly heavier conical bullet and is available in a variety of cartridge lengths.

Specifications
 Length:
 Case: .284 in (7.2 mm)
 Overall: .343 in (8.7 mm)
 Bullet weight: 18 gr (1.17 g)

See also
 .22 CB
 .22 Short
 .22 Long
 .22 Extra Long
 .22 Long Rifle
 .22 Magnum
 .22 Hornet
 List of rimfire cartridges

References

Pistol and rifle cartridges
Rimfire cartridges